The 1940 Ottawa Rough Riders finished in 1st place in the Interprovincial Rugby Football Union with a 5–1 record and won the Grey Cup.

Regular season

Standings

Schedule

Postseason

References

Ottawa Rough Riders seasons
James S. Dixon Trophy championship seasons
Grey Cup championship seasons